Atrytone arogos, the arogos skipper or beard-grass skipper, is a butterfly of the family Hesperiidae. It is found in the United States in isolated colonies in Georgia, peninsular Florida, the Gulf Coast, south-east North Dakota and central Minnesota south to southern Texas and the Colorado Front Range. Strays are found up to western Virginia, northern Arkansas and Illinois.

The wingspan is 29–37 mm. There is one generation with adults on wing from June to July in the north and west. In the south there are two generations with adults on wing from April to September.

The larvae feed on Andropogon gerardi, Panicum, Calamovilfa brevipilis and other grasses. Adults feed on the nectar from flowers of purple vetch, Canada thistle, dogbane, stiff coreopsis, purple coneflower, green milkweed and ox-eye daisy.

Subspecies
Atrytone arogos arogos
Atrytone arogos iowa

References

External links
Butterflies and Moths of North America
Bug Guide

Hesperiini
Butterflies described in 1834